Belle Cora (1827?–February 18/19, 1862), also known as Arabella Ryan, was a madam of the Barbary Coast of San Francisco during the mid-nineteenth century. She rose to public attention in 1855 when her lover, Charles Cora, killed US Marshall William H. Richardson after they had a conflict at the theater. She died in 1862.

Early life
Two portrayals of Belle Cora's childhood exist. The first lists her as the daughter of a minister in Baltimore who became pregnant as a teen. Upon discovering this, Cora's father threw her out of the house, prompting Cora to move to New Orleans. There, her baby died and she met Charles Cora. The alternate version, more prominently upheld, depicts Belle to be the daughter of Irish Catholic parents in Baltimore. In this version, Cora and her sister worked at a dress shop next to a brothel. Intrigued by the house, they became involved with the sex trade. At some point, Cora ventured to Charleston, South Carolina. During her time there, she became the mistress of a man who was later killed. His death prompted Cora to move to New Orleans where in 1849 she met Charles Cora.

Career

In December 1849, the couple moved to Sacramento, California and, while there, Belle helped fund Charles's high-stakes gambling. After some time, the couple moved to Marysville, California, and Belle opened her first brothel, called the New World. gambling parlor and offered games like poker, roulette, faro, and dice. At 23, they moved yet again and she opened a brothel in Sonora, California.

In 1852, Belle set up a parlor house on Washington street, in San Francisco, opposite the house of fellow madam, Ah Toy. Reverend William Taylor recounts the parlor house as being furnished with redwood, velvet, silk, demask, beautiful paintings and playing pianoforte, harp and melodeon. Belle hosted dinner parties with aldermen, judges, the mayor, and even members of the legislature. Even after an expensive legal battle and the lynching of her husband, Belle continued to run her brothel.

Murder of US Marshall Richardson and the aftermath
Belle Cora held a competing party (which had more guests) the same night as the wife of US Marshall William H. Richardson, which is said to have begun a rivalry between the women. The feud was further provoked one evening at the American Theatre. Richardson's wife complained to the manager that the Coras were seated in the same balcony as she was, as she felt that area should be reserved for more respectable guests. However, the manager refused to remove the couple, saying that they were regular customers of the first balcony. William left swearing vengeance upon Charles.

On November 17, 1855, between 6 and 7 o'clock, Charles Cora shot Marshall Richardson in the breast in front of Fox and O'Connor's store on Clay street between Leidesdorff and Montgomery Street.  He died instantaneously from the wound. Charles Cora was arrested, handed over to the city marshall, and later placed in the county jail.

Protests and lynch mobs erupted after the murder so Mayor James Van Ness placed Charles under a higher security accommodation for his own safety. Local citizens raised fund for a monument for Richardson in the Lone Mountain Cemetery and $15,000 for his children.

Belle funded several attorneys to represent Charles Cora including Edward Dickinson Baker and James A. McDougall. Belle paid Edward Dickinson Baker $15,000 of his $30,000 retainer in gold and sent meals to Charles Cora while he was in jail. In addition, she even went so far as trying to bribe the star witness Maria Knight to change her testimony. Alleging that Richardson had threatened Charles with a knife, the lawyers framed the case as one of self-defense. On 1856 January 17, Charles's trial ended with hung jury.

On May 15, 1856, the 2nd Committee of Vigilance was formed, and by May 17, the committee had gained 2500 members. The collected guns and began to conduct "army" drills. The following day, 3,000 armed members of the committee took Charles and James P. Casey. On 1856 May 18, in Sacramento, Governor Johnson, in response, appointed William Tecumseh Sherman as the Major-General commanding of the San Francisco division of the California State Militia. The related case of James Casey (who had shot newspaper editor James King of William in an assassination attempt) prompted the committee to aim a cannon at the jail and demand the release of Charles and Casey.

The 2nd Committee of Vigilance scheduled a new trial for 1856 May 20; James King of William died the same day. Samuel Brannan delivered a speech on justice and the enforcement of the law before the trial. Both men were found guilty, and on 1856 May 22, the committee sentenced both to hang the following day at noon. Before the execution, Belle and Charles got married by Father Michael Acoltti.

For fear of escape, 3,000 men and two field pieces led Charles to his execution, at the committee's headquarters at 41 Sacramento Street in front of a crowd of 20,000. Charles said nothing as the noose was placed around his head. The cord was cut at twenty minutes past one o'clock, leaving Charles to drop six feet and hang for fifty five minutes before being turned over to the coroner.

Death and legacy 
Belle Cora died at 35, in 1862, of pneumonia. She was buried in the Calvary Cemetery next to her husband. In 1916, the San Francisco Bulletin published a serial on Cora by Pauline Jacobson and, as a result, Belle was disinterred and reburied with Charles beneath a common headstone at the Mission Dolores Cemetery.

Karen Joy Fowler's alludes to Cora's influence on social norms in  novel Sister Noon. During a societal shift toward "civilizing" society, Belle had maintained her business, which had been seen as immoral. In the book Arresting Dress, the author Clare Sears opines that Cora inspires female financial agency and the use of sex for empowerment. In addition, Cora advocated against gender stereotypes, as demonstrated by her legal battle with the Vigilance Committee; ultimately she set the precedent to resist further legislation like that of sodomy laws in the 20th century.

See also 

 List of people from San Francisco

Footnotes

References

Works cited

General references

1820s births
1862 deaths
19th-century American businesspeople
People from San Francisco
American brothel owners and madams
19th century in San Francisco
Barbary Coast, San Francisco
Year of birth uncertain
19th-century American businesswomen
People from Marysville, California
People from Sonora, California
Burials at Calvary Cemetery (San Francisco, California)
Burials at Mission San Francisco de Asís